Ayaz may refer to:

 Ayaz (name), a given name and surname
Ayaz, East Azerbaijan, Iran
Ayask or Ayāz, a city in Iran
Ayaz, Mustafakemalpaşa, Turkey
Ayaz, Yenişehir, Turkey
Ayaz, Çorum